William Nawrocki was a member of the Wisconsin State Assembly.

Biography
Nawrocki was born on December 4, 1899 in Milwaukee, Wisconsin. He would become a shoe worker and a stock clerk.

Political career
Nawrocki was elected to the Assembly in 1940. Additionally, he was a member of the Milwaukee County, Wisconsin Committee from 1937 to 1940. He was a Democrat.

References

Politicians from Milwaukee
Democratic Party members of the Wisconsin State Assembly
1899 births
Year of death missing